Adel Tlatli is a Tunisian professional basketball coach.

Coaching career
Tlati has been the long-time head coach of the senior men's Tunisian national basketball team.  He has coached the team since the FIBA Africa Championship 2001.  At the FIBA Africa Championship 2009, Tlatli led the team to a bronze medal, earning the nation's first ever FIBA World Cup berth.

See also 
 List of FIBA AfroBasket winning head coaches

References

Living people
Tunisian basketball coaches
Year of birth missing (living people)